Dichograptus (meaning two-branched writing or double-line marks) is an extinct genus of graptolites from the Ordovician.

Dichograptus probably fed on plankton. Individual animals were very tiny, only growing a few millimeters in length (1/8 of an inch).

Distribution 
Fossils of Dichograptus have been found in Argentina, Chile, China, Colombia (near Caño Cristales, Meta), New Zealand, Norway, and the United Kingdom.

References

Further reading 
 Parker, Steve. Dinosaurus: the complete guide to dinosaurs. Firefly Books Inc, 2003. Pg. 55

Graptolite genera
Ordovician animals of Asia
Ordovician animals of Europe
Ordovician animals of South America
Ordovician Argentina
Ordovician Chile
Ordovician Colombia
Fossils of Colombia
Fossil taxa described in 1863